FNP may refer to

Politics 
 Fijian Nationalist Party, a defunct political party in Fiji
 Freedom Now Party, a defunct political party in the United States
 Frisian National Party, a political party in the Netherlands
 National Progressive Force, a political party in the Dominican Republic

Other uses 
 FNP (complexity)
 Family nurse practitioner
 FlexNet Publisher, a software license manager
 Ferns N Petals, an Indian retailer
 FN FNP, a series of pistols
 Foundation for Polish Science,
 Friday Night Productions, an Indian entertainment company
 The Friday Night Project, a British television programme
 The Frederick News-Post, a newspaper in Frederick, Maryland
 National Property Administration in Taiwan